Aase Hansen may refer to:
 Aase Hansen (writer) (1893–1981), Danish author and translator
 Aase Hansen (actor) (1935–1993), Danish actor